Qeshlaq-e Malek Kandi (also Romanized as Qeshlāq-e Malek Kandī) is a village in Qeshlaq-e Shomali Rural District, in the Central District of Parsabad County, Ardabil Province, Iran. At the 2006 census, its population was 197, in 45 families.

References 

Towns and villages in Parsabad County